The Mallikarjuna Temple at Hirenallur is a Hoysala era construction. Hirenallur is a village, about 12 km from Kadur, Chikkamagaluru district, in the Karnataka state, India. The monument is protected by the Karnataka state division of Archaeological Survey of India. The monument which was in a state of dis-repair was renovated around 2004 by the "Sri Dharmasthala Manjunathaeshwara Dharmothana Trust", with assistance of the Department of Culture, Government of India.

References

Further reading

 Gerard Foekema, A Complete Guide to Hoysala Temples, Abhinav, 1996 
 
 Adam Hardy, Indian Temple Architecture: Form and Transformation : the Karṇāṭa Drāviḍa Tradition, 7th to 13th Centuries, Abhinav, 1995, New Delhi, .

Gallery

Hindu temples in Chikkamagaluru district